Senior Lieutenant Gürcan Ulucan Airfield or just Temelli Airfield is a small airfield located approximately  southwest of Ankara, Turkey. The airfield is operated by the Army Air Command of the Turkish Land Forces and is used primarily for training and educational purposes.

Airports in Turkey
Military in Ankara
Transport in Ankara Province
Turkish Army air bases